Jack Lemmon was an American actor. He collaborated with Billy Wilder and Walter Matthau on many films.

Film

Television

Theatre

Discography

 A Twist of Lemmon (Eic, 1958)
 Some Like It Hot (1959)
 "Daphne"/"Sleepy Lagoon" (single not contained in the above album, 1959)
 ""I'm Forever Blowing Bubbles"/"I Cover the Waterfront" (single, 1960)
 "The Apartment"/"Lemmon Blues" (single, piano solos, 1960)
 Jack Lemmon Plays Piano Selections from "Irma La Douce" (Capitol, 1963)
 Piano and Vocals (1990)
 Peter and the Wolf (1991)
 A Twist of Lemmon/Some Like It Hot (Collector's Choice reissue, 2001)

References

Male actor filmographies
American filmographies